Gabriel Agustín Hauche, nicknamed Demonio (demon), (born 27 November 1986 in Buenos Aires) is an Argentine professional footballer who plays as a forward for Racing Club in the Argentine Primera División.

Career

Club career
Hauche started his playing career with Temperley in the lower leagues of Argentine football in 2004. He was signed by Argentinos Juniors of the Argentine Primera in 2006 and soon established himself as an important member of the first team squad. He was part of the team that reached the semifinals in the Copa Sudamericana 2008, where they lost to Estudiantes de la Plata.

In January 2010 he joined Racing Club de Avellaneda.
On 7 February he scored his first goal in Racing Club de Avellenada in a 2-4 defeat to Arsenal de Sarandí.

In december 2014, he gots Argentine Primera División champion after defeating Godoy Cruz and River Plate.

Outside Argentina
On 30 December 2014, Hauche was presented as a new player for Liga MX team Club Tijuana. On 13 December 2017, Hauche re-signed a 6-month loan with Deportivo Toluca, following an initial 12-month loan. In July 2018, Hauche signed for Colombian team Millonarios. Hauche scored 3 times in 27 games in all competitions during his time in Colombia.

Return to Argentina
On 2 January 2019, Hauche re-joined Argentinos Juniors, signing an 18-month contract. On 18 February 2019, Hauche scored his first goal since re-joining the club in the 78th minute against Estudiantes in the Superliga Argentina, to give his team a 2–1 victory.

At 2022, he joined again to Racing Club.  In november, he wins another championship, the Trofeo de Campeones de la Liga Profesional, after defeating Boca Juniors 2-1.

Career statistics

International career
Hauche was called up to the Argentina national team for the first time on September 30, 2009 for a friendly match against Ghana. The Argentine squad was formed exclusively by Argentine league players and included his Argentinos Juniors' teammates Ignacio Canuto and Matías Caruzzo.

He made his second appearance for Argentina in a 3-2 win against Costa Rica on 26 January 2010.

References

External links
 Argentine Primera statistics at Fútbol XXI

1986 births
Living people
Footballers from Buenos Aires
Argentine people of French descent
Argentine footballers
Argentine expatriate footballers
Argentina international footballers
Association football forwards
Club Atlético Temperley footballers
Argentinos Juniors footballers
Racing Club de Avellaneda footballers
A.C. ChievoVerona players
Club Tijuana footballers
Deportivo Toluca F.C. players
Aldosivi footballers
Argentine Primera División players
Serie A players
Liga MX players
Expatriate footballers in Italy
Expatriate footballers in Mexico
Argentine expatriate sportspeople in Italy
Argentine expatriate sportspeople in Mexico